Henry Caulfield may refer to:

 Henry S. Caulfield (1873–1966), American lawyer and politician
 Henry P. Caulfield Jr. (1915–2002), American political scientist